is a Japanese anime designer, screenwriter and director. Izubuchi is credited for designing costumes, characters and creatures, but most of his designs are mechanical (both robots and other vehicles). He created and directed the RahXephon series and also created a manga story called Rune Masquer.

Among Izubuchi's design credits are the mecha from Panzer World Galient as well as some Gundam and Patlabor shows. He also created the Protect-Gear armor used in the Kerberos saga (Jin-Roh, etc.).

The ADV Films promotional materials for RahXephon and some reviews  Gasaraki is an Izubuchi credit, but although he did mecha design on that show he was not responsible for writing or directing.

Izubuchi designed the costume for one of the characters of the Cutie Honey live action movie (2004), directed by Hideaki Anno of Neon Genesis Evangelion fame; earlier, Anno and Izubuchi (called "Bu-chan" by Anno) both had their mecha designs appear on Mobile Suit Gundam: Char's Counterattack (1988).

Izubuchi did some additional design work for Tomoki Kyoda's Eureka Seven. Kyoda was an assistant director and episode director on RahXephon and directed its theatrical adaptation.

Izubuchi's work also extends to tokusatsu, doing monster designs for Kagaku Sentai Dynaman, Choudenshi Bioman, Dengeki Sentai Changeman, Choushinsei Flashman, Kamen Rider Agito, and Kamen Rider OOO.

As of 2006, Izubuchi said that the design work he was most proud of was on WXIII: Patlabor the Movie 3.

Izubuchi is the creative producer of Tetsuwan Birdy: Decode (2008).

In 2008, he designed a character for Namco Bandai's fighting game, Soulcalibur IV named Scheherazade.

Notes and references

External links 

Sunrise (company) people
1958 births
Living people
Anime directors
Manga artists from Tokyo
Mechanical designers (mecha)